Trigonopterus lima is a species of flightless weevil in the genus Trigonopterus from Indonesia.

Etymology
The specific name is derived from the Indonesian word for "five".

Description
Individuals measure 2.03–2.17 mm in length.  Body is slightly oval in shape.  General coloration is dark rust-colored or black, with bronze-tinted elytra; the head, antennae, and legs are rust-colored.

Range

Phylogeny
T. lima is part of the T. saltator species group.

References

lima
Beetles described in 2014
Beetles of Asia
Insects of Indonesia